Velika Dolina (literally, 'big valley') is a village in the Municipality of Brežice in eastern Slovenia. The area is part of the traditional region of Lower Carniola. It is now included with the rest of the municipality in the Lower Sava Statistical Region.

The parish church in the settlement is dedicated to the Assumption of Mary and belongs to the Roman Catholic Diocese of Novo Mesto. It was built in 1885 on the site of an earlier church.

References

External links

Velika Dolina on Geopedia

Populated places in the Municipality of Brežice